Stage a Number is a TV series on the DuMont Television Network which was broadcast in the US on Wednesdays at 9pm ET from September 10, 1952, to May 20, 1953.

It was a live talent show for dancers, singers, acrobats and other entertainers. A panel of celebrity judges decided on two winners who were invited to appear the following week.

Bill Wendell was the host.

Production
Stage a Number was a sustaining program that originated at WABD. Roger Gerry was the producer, and Barry Shear was the director. Bill Dalzell was the writer, and Bill Wirges was the music director.

Episode status
As with most DuMont series, no episodes are known to exist.

See also
List of programs broadcast by the DuMont Television Network
List of surviving DuMont Television Network broadcasts
1952-53 United States network television schedule

References

Bibliography
David Weinstein, The Forgotten Network: DuMont and the Birth of American Television (Philadelphia: Temple University Press, 2004) 
Alex McNeil, Total Television, Fourth edition (New York: Penguin Books, 1980) 
Tim Brooks and Earle Marsh, The Complete Directory to Prime Time Network TV Shows, Third edition (New York: Ballantine Books, 1964)

External links
Stage a Number at IMDB
DuMont historical website

DuMont Television Network original programming
1952 American television series debuts
1953 American television series endings
Black-and-white American television shows
Lost television shows
1950s American television series